Harry Dunkinson (December 16, 1876 – March 14, 1936) was an American film and stage actor. He appeared in more than 140 films between 1912 and 1935. He was born in New York City and died in California.

Dunkinson began acting on stage when he was nine years old. His work in films began with Essanay. He worked primarily in silent films, with his roles diminishing after sound films were introduced.

Selected filmography

 The Battle of Love (1914) - Jack Sanford
 The Slim Princess (1915) - Count Selim Malagaski
 The Broken Pledge (1915, Short) - Harold
 The Blindness of Virtue (1915) - Aberlady's butler
 In the Palace of the King (1915) - Priest
 The Crimson Wing (1915) - Don Rodrigo Valera
 The Raven (1915) - Tony
 The Misleading Lady (1916) - Boney
 The Strange Case of Mary Page (1916) - E.H. Daniels, Show Manager
 Skinner's Dress Suit (1917) - Willard Jackson
 The Trufflers (1917) - Abe Silverstone
 Filling His Own Shoes (1917)
 On Trial (1917) - Attorney for the Defense
 Follow the Girl (1917) - Hong Foo
 The Edge of the Law (1917) - Spike
 Danger Within (1918) - Dr. Trevick
 Selfish Yates (1918) - Ed Miller, the 'Oklahoma Hog'
 A Soul for Sale (1918) - Wilbur Simons
 Kidder & Ko (1918) - Silas Kidder
 The Brass Bullet (1918)
 The Forbidden Room (1919) - Police Chief
 The Rebellious Bride (1919) - Jimmy O'Shay
 The Coming of the Law (1919) - Sheriff
 A Rogue's Romance (1919)
 Chasing Rainbows (1919) - Jerry
 Love Is Love (1919) - Dave Wilson
 The Willow Tree (1920) - Jeoffrey Fuller
 Rouge and Riches (1920) - Max Morko
 The Daredevil (1920) - Ranch Owner
 Molly and I (1920) - Jack Herrick
 Forbidden Trails (1920) - Henry Parsons
 The Husband Hunter (1920) - Arthur Elkins
 Officer 666 (1920) - Policeman Phelan - Officer 666
 Beware of the Bride (1920) - Pete Noble
 Prairie Trails (1920) - Ike Stork
 The Land of Jazz (1920) - Mr. Dumbardon
 Why Trust Your Husband? (1921) - Uncle Horace
 The Blushing Bride (1921) - Butler
 The Tomboy (1921) - The Circus Manager
A Ridin' Romeo (1921) - King Brentwood
 The Big Town Round-Up (1921) - Luther Beaumont
 The Primal Law (1921) - Carson
 The Last Trail (1921) - Kenworth Samson
 The Duke of Chimney Butte (1921) - Jedlick
 Trailin' (1921) - Sandy Ferguson (uncredited)
 The Fast Mail (1922) - Harry Joyce
 Mine to Keep (1923) - Sewell
 Soft Boiled (1923) - The Storekeeper
 Sting of the Scorpion (1923)
 Bag and Baggage (1923) - Hotel Detective
 Gentle Julia (1923) - Uncle Joe Atwater
 The Diamond Bandit (1924) - Friar Michael
 The Last Man on Earth (1924) - Elmer's Father
 Lash of the Whip (1924)
 The Desert's Price (1925) - Sheriff
 A Bankrupt Honeymoon (1926, Short) - Harold's Lawyer
 Lash of the Whip (1926) - Pinto's servant
 Mulhall's Greatest Catch (1926) - Con McCarren
 Doubling with Danger (1926) - Detective McCade
 Smile, Brother, Smile (1927) - Mr. Potter
 Silver Valley (1927) - Mike McCool
 Sporting Goods (1928)
 Dressed to Kill (1928)
 The Farmer's Daughter (1928) - (uncredited)
 Amateur Daddy (1932) - Fat Hicks (uncredited)
 Tillie and Gus (1933) - Bartender (uncredited)
 Design for Living (1933) - Mr. Egelbauer (uncredited)
 David Harum (1934) - Townsman (uncredited)
 Stand Up and Cheer! (1934) - Quartet Member (uncredited)
 Ferocious Pal (1934) - Sheriff Dick Williams
 Another Wild Idea (1934, Short) - Judge (uncredited)
 Going Bye-Bye! (1934, Short) - Judge (uncredited)
 Servants' Entrance (1934) - Innkeeper (uncredited)
 The Captain Hates the Sea (1934) - Passenger (uncredited)
 I'll Fix It (1934) - Minor Role (uncredited)
 Broadway Bill (1934) - (uncredited)
 The County Chairman (1935) - (uncredited)
 The Whole Town's Talking (1935) - Customer (uncredited)
 Life Begins at 40 (1935) - Abercrombie's Friend (uncredited)
 George White's 1935 Scandals (1935) - Postman (uncredited)
 Vagabond Lady (1935) - Dock Official (uncredited)
 This Is the Life (1935) - Mailman (uncredited)
 Grand Exit (1935) - Mueller (uncredited)
 Thanks a Million (1935) - Politician (uncredited)
 Nevada (1935) - Poker Player

References

External links

1876 births
1936 deaths
American male film actors
American male silent film actors
Male actors from New York City
20th-century American male actors